Christmass is a live and studio album by Frank Black, originally released by Cooking Vinyl on December 18, 2006 via mail-order only, then to stores on February 5, 2007. It includes a live DVD from a solo acoustic show.

Contents
Christmass consists of fifteen live acoustic recordings from August and September 2006 and five new studio tracks recorded partly in hotel rooms and partly at Planet of Sound studios in Hartford, Connecticut. The accompanying DVD contains selections from a live acoustic show recorded at Harlow's Night Club in Sacramento, California, on August 31, 2006. The album was recorded by Myles Mangino, a sound engineer for Frank Black and a longtime Pixies lighting designer.

Track listing

DVD (Live at Harlow's Night Club, Sacramento, CA, August 31, 2006)

Personnel
Musicians
 Frank Black – vocals, guitar
 Rob Laufer – guitar (track 1)
 Jeff Ladd – bass (tracks 1, 6, 10)
 Myles Mangino – guitar (track 6)
 Erik James – strings, piano (track 6), synthesizer (track 10), organ (track 15)
 Dan Prindle – cello (track 6)
 Jay Anick – violin (track 6)
 Mark Mulcahy – backing vocals (tracks 14, 15)
 Rami Jaffee – accordion (tracks 17, 18)
Technical
 Myles Mangino – engineer, live recording engineer (tracks 1-16)
 Chris Henderson – assistant engineer (tracks 1, 6, 14)
 Geoff Templeton – live recording engineer (tracks 17-19)
 Andrew Swainson – design

References

Black Francis albums
2006 video albums
2006 compilation albums
Cooking Vinyl compilation albums
Cooking Vinyl video albums